Avangard Nikolaevich Leontiev (born February 27, 1947, in Moscow) is a Soviet and Russian theater and film actor, teacher, professor. People's Artist of the Russian Federation (1995). Laureate of the State Prize of the Russian Federation (1995).

Selected filmography
   Train Stop – Two Minutes (1972) as viewer
 Little Tragedies (1979) as Solomon
 A Few Days from the Life of I. I. Oblomov (1980) as Alexeyev
 Alone and Unarmed (1984) as photographer
 The Tale of Tsar Saltan (1984) as narrator
 Dark Eyes (1987) as official in St. Petersburg
 The Parrot Speaking Yiddish (1990) as Zaremba
 Burnt by the Sun (1994) as Chauffeur
 The Barber of Siberia (1998) as Andrei's uncle
 Silver Lily of the Valley (2000) as episode
 Yesenin  (2005) as Anatoly Lunacharsky
 Adjutants of Love (2005) as Paul I of Russia
 Sunstroke (2014) as  prestidigitator
 The Age of Pioneers (2017) as Yuri Levitan
 Van Goghs (2018) as Veniamin

References

External links
   

1947 births
Male actors  from Moscow
Living people
Soviet male film actors
Soviet male stage actors
Soviet male voice actors
Russian male film actors
Russian male stage actors
Russian male voice actors
20th-century Russian  male actors
21st-century Russian male actors
Recipients of the Order of Honour (Russia)
People's Artists of Russia
Honored Artists of the RSFSR
State Prize of the Russian Federation laureates
Moscow Art Theatre School alumni